In graph theory, a dipole graph, dipole, bond graph, or linkage, is a multigraph consisting of two vertices connected with a number of parallel edges. The  dipole graph is dual to the cycle graph .

Similarly to the Platonic graphs, the dipole graphs form the skeletons of the hosohedra. Their duals, the cycle graphs, form the skeletons of the dihedra.

References

 
 Jonathan L. Gross and Jay Yellen, 2006. Graph Theory and Its Applications, 2nd Ed., p. 17. Chapman & Hall/CRC. 
 Sunada T., Topological Crystallography, With a View Towards Discrete Geometric Analysis,  Springer, 2013,  (Print) 978-4-431-54177-6 (Online)

Extensions and generalizations of graphs
Parametric families of graphs
Regular graphs